Hot knife may refer to:

 A form of soldering iron equipped with a double-edged blade that is situated on a heating element 
 Hot knife (smoking), a method of smoking cannabis
 "Hot Knife", a song by Fiona Apple from her 2012 album The Idler Wheel...

See also
 "Hot Knives", a 2007 song by Bright Eyes